Paul Edwards (born 10 November 1982) is an English former footballer who played in the Football League for Crewe Alexandra.

References

English footballers
English Football League players
1982 births
Living people
Crewe Alexandra F.C. players
Stafford Rangers F.C. players
Southport F.C. players
Footballers from Derby
Association football forwards